The Haleakalā Trail  (also sometimes known as the Haleakala Bridle Trail) is the historic public access route to Haleakalā Crater and the summit of Haleakalā, which are now part of Haleakalā National Park.

Description

The historic Haleakala Trail is a trail, approximately eight miles in length, on a fifteen percent grade between Olinda, Maui, and the summit of Haleakala.

History

In 1828, the missionaries Lorrin Andrews, William Richards, and Jonathan Green, describe ascending Haleakala from the coast at Hamakuapoko (near modern day Paia), ascending a trail that was described by their Hawaiian guides as long but of easy descent.

In 1885, Haleakala Trail was shown on a map of Maui published by the Hawaiian Government Survey, prepared under the direction of Surveyor-General William DeWitt Alexander.

Around 1888, the Kingdom of Hawaii improved Haleakala Trail in a public works project.

In 1905, the Territory of Hawai'i improved Haleakala Trail to accommodate in increase in tourism. The Maui News reported on November 4, 1905 that: "It will be of general interest to the people of the Islands to learn that the Haleakala trail is now completed to the top of the crater.". At this time, the trail was also marked by guideposts every 500 feet in order to assist travelers finding their way in the fog, which is a common occurrence in the area.

In 1935, with the completion of State of Hawaii road 378, the current access to Haleakalā National Park, the Haleakala Trail fell into disuse. However, as late as 1972, Haleakala Trail continued to be in use as a horse trail.

In 2014, the portion of the Haleakala Trail that traverses land owned by Haleakala Ranch Company was the subject of a jury trial before the Second Circuit Court of the State of Hawaii. After a six-week trial, the jury determined that the State of Hawaii, not Haleakala Ranch Company, owned the trail. The jury found that Haleakala Trail is a public trail protected under the Highways Act of 1892 and that it is the successor to the ancient trail that existed before the Mahele land division of 1848, when all land in Hawaii was in the public domain.

See also
 Haleakalā National Park
 Haleakala Wilderness

References

External links
 Haleakalā National Park website
 Hawaii Nature Notes: the Historical Background(1959)
 Public Access Trails Hawaii (PATH) website

Hiking trails in Hawaii
Haleakalā National Park